Chances Are may refer to:

Music
 Chances Are (album), a 1981 album by Bob Marley
 "Chances Are" (song), a 1957 song written by Al Stillman and Robert Allen, popularized by Johnny Mathis
 "Chances Are", a song by Bob Seger and Martina McBride from Hope Floats: Music from the Motion Picture, 1998
 "Chances Are", a song by Invertigo from Forum, 2001
 "Chances Are", a song by Sheryl Crow from Wildflower, 2005
 "Chances Are", a song by Stereophonics from Scream Above the Sounds, 2017

Other uses
 Chances Are (film), a 1989 romantic comedy
 Chances Are..., a 2019 novel by Richard Russo